Yellowberries Copse is an Iron Age enclosure, or possibly hill fort situated South of South Brent in Devon, England. The fort is situated on the North West slope of Cutwell Hill at approx 155 Metres above Sea Level.

References

Hill forts in Devon